Samir Bannout is  a Lebanese retired former Mr olympia 1983
IFBB professional bodybuilder and coach.

Biography
Known as "the Lion of Lebanon", Samir Bannout won the Mr. Olympia title in 1983. Bannout has appeared on the covers of many fitness and bodybuilding publications, including Strength and Health, MuscleMag International, Muscle Digest, Flex, Muscle Training Illustrated, Muscle and Fitness, Muscle Up, IronMan and Muscular Development magazines.

Samir Bannout left his native Lebanon and emigrated to America where he first moved to Detroit, Michigan. 
He began competing at the amateur level where he rose up the ranks and eventually achieved IFBB pro status by winning his light-heavyweight class at the 1979 IFBB World Amateur Championships. By this time Samir had already relocated to Santa Monica, California. Bannout took 4th place at the 1982 Mr. Olympia contest and returned the following year to take home the title in 1983 winning the contest to become Mr. Olympia 1983. The contest was held in Munich, Germany that year and the trophy awarded to him is called a "Sandow" for Eugen Sandow.  Bannout weighed 196 lbs. for his win at the contest which made him the last Mr. Olympia to weigh under 200 lbs.  His victory ended what is referred to as the "aesthetics" era for the Mr. Olympia contest which had originally started with American Frank Zane winning the title in 1977 and reverted to emphasizing increased mass and size starting with American Lee Haney winning in 1984 for the first time and following up his inaugural victory with 7 additional consecutive wins for a record grand total of 8 titles. 

The extreme muscular definition that Bannout achieved in his lower back region helped to shape "Lebanon Cedar" when referring the shape made visible during a back pose on the competition stage.

After placing 6th at the 1984 Olympia, the IFBB suspended him for three years as punishment for his participation at the World Championship competition of a rival federation, the WABBA. 

Samir Bannout did not get a top six placing another time at a Mr. Olympia contest despite competing at the event many more times. In 1990 he won his second IFBB pro show, the IFBB Pittsburgh Pro Invitational. His professional career lasted 17 years.

Samir Bannout has been open about his past use of anabolic steroids: "I have to be quite truthful with you, I have used anabolics, I'm not going to have to deny it, because all the other Mr Olympia contenders, I feel that they are using it, and I only use it to reverse catabolic effect." Bannout openly criticizes the IFBB during the years he competed, in that he felt that he had been "robbed" of winning in other events and that there was significant political undertones to selection of winners at the Mr. Olympia.

Today Samir Bannout lives in Los Angeles, California with his wife Randa and his three children Lea, Jesse, Sergio. He was inducted to the IFBB Hall of Fame in 2002. He was previously married to the sister of fellow IFBB professional Lee Labrada, Lourdes; they had two daughters.

Bodybuilding History

 1974 Mr. Universe, Medium Class 7th (Youngest contestant)
 1976 Mr. Universe, Middleweight 12th
 1977 Mr. International, Middleweight 2nd
 1978 Mr. International, Middleweight 2nd
 1979 Best in the World, Amateur 1st
 1979 Canada Pro Cup, N/A
 1979 World Amateur Championships, Light Heavyweight 1st
 1980 Grand Prix California 4th
 1980 Grand Prix Pennsylvania 7th
 1980 Night of Champions 10th
 1980 Mr. Olympia 15th
 1980 Pittsburgh Pro Invitational N/A
 1981 Grand Prix California 7th
 1981 Grand Prix New England 6th
 1981 Night of Champions 10th
 1981 Mr. Olympia 9th
1982 Grand Prix Sweden 2nd
1982 Mr. Olympia 4th
1983 Mr. Olympia 1st
1984 Canada Pro Cup 5th
1984 Mr. Olympia 6th
1984 World Grand Prix 5th
1985 WABBA World Championship 1st
1986 WABBA World Championship 1st
1988 Grand Prix England 10th
1988 Grand Prix Italy 9th
1988 Mr. Olympia 8th
1989 Arnold Schwarzenegger Classic 4th
1989 Grand Prix Finland 6th
1989 Grand Prix France 8th
1989 Grand Prix Germany 5th
1989 Grand Prix Holland 5th
1989 Grand Prix Spain 5th
1989 Grand Prix Spain (2nd) 5th
1989 Grand Prix Sweden 3rd
1989 Mr. Olympia 9th
1990 Arnold Schwarzenegger Classic 4th
1990 Grand Prix England 6th
1990 Grand Prix Finland 5th
1990 Grand Prix Italy 6th
1990 Houston Pro Invitational 2rd
1990 Mr. Olympia 8th
1990 Pittsburgh Pro Invitational 1st (Winner)
1990 NABBA World Championships Professional 2nd
1991 Mr. Olympia 16th
1992 Arnold Schwarzenegger Classic N/A
1992 Grand Prix Germany 11th
1992 Mr. Olympia 16th
1993 Arnold Schwarzenegger Classic 13th
1993 Ironman Pro Invitational 13th
1993 San Jose Pro Invitational 10th
1994 Grand Prix England 14th
1994 Grand Prix Germany 13th
1994 Grand Prix Italy 12th
1994 Grand Prix Spain 12th
1994 Mr. Olympia 19th
1996 Masters Mr. Olympia 6th
2011 IFBB Pro World Masters Bodybuilding 11th

Distinctions
The first Middle Eastern bodybuilder to win the Mr. Olympia.
The only bodybuilder to defeat eight-time Mr. Olympia Lee Haney in a Mr. Olympia contest.
The only bodybuilder to have won the Mr. Olympia as his first professional bodybuilding title.
The last Mr. Olympia to weigh under 200 lbs.

See also
List of male professional bodybuilders
List of female professional bodybuilders
Mr. Olympia
Arnold Classic

References

Notes
Roark, Joe. (December, 2002). "Factoids - History - Samir Bannout". Flex

External links
MuscleSport Radio interview with Joe Pietaro, 11/25/08
   

| colspan = 3 align = center | Mr. Olympia 
|- 
| width = 30% align = center | Preceded by:Chris Dickerson
| width = 40% align = center | First (1983)
| width = 30% align = center | Succeeded by:Lee Haney

Living people
1955 births
Lebanese bodybuilders
Bodybuilders
Professional bodybuilders
Sportspeople from Beirut
Lebanese emigrants to the United States